The San Bernardino Sun is a paid daily newspaper in San Bernardino County. Founded in 1894, it has significant circulation in neighboring Riverside County, and serves most of the Inland Empire in Southern California, with a circulation area spanning from the border of Los Angeles and Orange counties to the west, east to Yucaipa, north to the San Bernardino Mountain range and south to the Riverside County line. Its local competitor is The Press-Enterprise in Riverside. It publishes the annual PrepXtra high school football magazine with capsules and schedules for all schools  in Pomona Valley and San Bernardino Counties.

Times Mirror, owner of the Los Angeles Times, bought the paper in 1964, but was ordered to sell it due to antitrust concerns. Gannett purchased it in 1968, and MediaNews Group took control of it in 1999, making it a sister newspaper to the Times''' rival, the Los Angeles Daily News. It is a member of the Southern California News Group.

At various times, the newspaper was known as The Sun, The Sun-telegram, and The San Bernardino County Sun''.

References

External links

The San Bernardino Sun
Official mobile website

Mass media in San Bernardino, California
Daily newspapers published in Greater Los Angeles
Mass media in the Inland Empire
Mass media in San Bernardino County, California
Publications established in 1894
1894 establishments in California
MediaNews Group publications
Gannett publications
Digital First Media